George Newton Swallow (January 2, 1854 – November 23, 1931) was an American politician who served in the Massachusetts General Court and on the Massachusetts Governor's Council. He was the Republican nominee for Mayor of Boston in the 1903 Boston mayoral election

Early life
Swallow was born in Charlestown on January 2, 1854. He entered the grocery business in 1872 and was the head of the A. N. Swallow & Co., a wholesale grocery firm. He resided in Charlestown until 1901 when he purchased 137 Bay State Road in Boston's Back Bay neighborhood.

Political career
Swallow represented Boston’s Ward 5 in the Massachusetts House of Representatives in 1889, 1890, and 1891. He was a member of the Republican state committee in 1892 and 1893. In 1894 he represented the 2nd Suffolk district in the Massachusetts Senate. In 1894, Swallow was an unsuccessful candidate for the Republican nomination for the 3rd district seat on the Massachusetts Governor's Council. He was elected to the council in 1897 and served from 1898 to 1899.

In 1899, Swallow was chairman of the Boston Republican committee. That year, the Republicans were successful in electing Thomas N. Hart Mayor. Swallow campaigned vigorously for Hart and was alleged to have spent $13,000 of his own money on the campaign. By 1901, Hart and Swallow had fallen out and some younger members of the Republican party who were dissatisfied with Hart’s administration proposed Swallow as a candidate for the Republican nomination. After six months of consideration, Swallow announced he would not challenge Hart in the 1901 Boston mayoral election.

Swallow was a candidate for mayor in the 1903 Boston mayoral election. He easily defeated Michael J. Murray and E. Peabody Gerry for the Republican nomination. Swallow lost the general election to Democratic incumbent Patrick Collins 63% to 29%.

Later life
On January 27, 1904, Swallow’s wife died at the home of a relative in Hopkinton, Massachusetts. The cause of death was found to be suicide by morphine overdose. The Swallows had been separated for about a year prior to her death. Swallow later remarried and moved to West Roxbury. He died on November 23, 1931. He was survived by his wife and three sons.

References

1854 births
1931 deaths
American grocers
Republican Party Massachusetts state senators
Republican Party members of the Massachusetts House of Representatives
Members of the Massachusetts Governor's Council
People from Charlestown, Boston
Politicians from Boston